A Spanner in the Works  is the seventeenth studio album released by Rod Stewart on 29 May 1995. It ended a four-year gap since his previous studio album. At that time, it was Stewart's longest break between albums. It was released on Warner Bros. Records in the United States, the United Kingdom, and Japan.  Five singles were released: "You're The Star", "Leave Virginia Alone", "This", "Lady Luck", and "Purple Heather".

Content
The album includes covers of Bob Dylan's "Sweetheart Like You" and The Blue Nile's "The Downtown Lights".  The song "Muddy, Sam and Otis" is Stewart's tribute to Muddy Waters, Sam Cooke, and Otis Redding.  Track 12, later released as a single featuring the Scottish Euro '96 Football Squad, "Purple Heather" is a folk song that normally goes by the name "Wild Mountain Thyme". It is often credited as traditional, but was written by Francis McPeake. "Leave Virginia Alone" was written by Tom Petty and recorded for his album Wildflowers, but was left off the finished album and given to Stewart instead.

Track listing

Personnel 

 Rod Stewart – lead vocals, backing vocals (5), arrangements (12)
 Kevin Savigar – keyboards (1-12), bass (5, 8), string arrangements and conductor (7, 11), squeezebox (12)
 Eric Caudieux – programming (1)
 Mike Higham – programming (1, 2, 4, 5, 8, 9), digital manipulation (1, 2, 4, 5, 8, 9), keyboards (2, 8), bass (8)
 Trevor Horn – programming (1, 2, 4, 5, 8, 9), digital manipulation (1, 2, 4, 5, 8, 9), bass (1), backing vocals (1)
 Jamie Muhoberac – keyboards (2), acoustic piano solo (9), percussion (9)
 James Newton Howard – keyboards (3)
 Martin O'Conner – accordion (6)
 Billy Preston – Hammond organ (11)
 Jeff Golub – guitar (1, 3, 4, 6, 8, 12), electric guitar (9)
 Robin LeMesurier – guitar (1, 6, 7, 10, 11), guitar solo (4)
 Tim Pierce – guitar (1, 2, 5, 8)
 David Lindley – bouzouki (1)
 Don Teschner – mandolin (1, 6), fiddle (6)
 Davey Johnstone – guitar (3), mandolin (3)
 Jim Cregan – guitar (5)
 Dónal Lunny – bouzouki (6, 12) 
 Michael Landau – guitar (7)
 Andy Taylor – guitar (7, 10, 11)
 Lol Creme – electric guitar (9)
  Guy Pratt – acoustic guitar (9), bass (9)
 Stephen Lipson – bass (2, 4), guitar (4)
 Leland Sklar – bass (3)
 Carmine Rojas – bass (6, 12)
 Bernard Edwards – bass (7, 10, 11)
 David Palmer – drums (1, 4, 6, 7, 8, 10, 11, 12)
 Paul Robinson – drums (2, 5)
 Kenny Aronoff – drums (3)
 Frank Ricotti – drums (5)
 Paulinho da Costa – percussion (1)
 Máire Ní Chathasaigh – Irish fiddle (6)
 John McSherry – bagpipes (6)
 Leslie Butler – harmonica (9)
 The Kick Horns – horns and horn arrangements (9):
 Simon Clarke – saxophone
 Tim Sanders – saxophone
 Neil Sidwell – trombone
 Roddy Lorimer – trumpet
 Lenny Pickett – saxophone (11), horn arrangements (11)
 David Woodford – saxophone (11), horn arrangements (11)
 Nick Lane – trombone (11), horn arrangements (11)
 Rick Braun – trumpet (11), horn arrangements (11)
 Anne Dudley – string arrangements and conductor (1, 2, 4, 5, 8, 12), acoustic piano (8)
 Gavyn Wright – orchestra leader (1, 2, 4, 5, 8, 12)
 Susie Katayama – orchestra leader (7, 11)
 Aleisha Irving – backing vocals (2)
 Joe Turano – backing vocals (3, 7)
 Joey Diggs – backing vocals (7, 8)
 Lamont Van Hook – backing vocals (7, 8)
 Fred White – backing vocals (7, 8)
 Luana Jackman – choir coordinator (7)
 Bobbi Page – choir coordinator (7)
 Josef Powell – backing vocals (10, 11)
 Oren Waters – backing vocals (10, 11)
 Terry Young – backing vocals (10, 11)
 Glasgow Gaelic Music Association – choir (12)
 Kenneth Thompson – choir leader (12)

Production 
 Executive Producers – Rob Dickins and Michael Ostin
 Recording – Tim Weidner (Tracks 1, 2 & 5); Steve MacMillan (Track 3); Le Mobile (Tracks 4-12).
 Engineer – Charlie Bouis (Tracks 6-12)
 Assistant Recording – Mike Baumgartner (Tracks 1)
 Assistant Engineer – Eric Johnston (Tracks 7-12)
 Mixed by Steve MacMillan 
 Mix Assistants – Danny Alonso (Tracks 1 & 2); Rich Rowe (Tracks 1, 2, 4, 5, 9 & 12); Pat 59 (Track 6); Rail Rogut (Tracks 7, 8, 10 & 11).
 Mixed at Sarm Studios (London); Conway Studios (Hollywood); A&M Studios and Ocean Way Recording.
 Mastered by Stephen Marcussen at Precision Mastering (Hollywood).
 Design – Greg Ross
 Photography – Herb Ritts
 Management – Annie Challis, Randy Phillips and Arnold Stiefel at Stiefel Phillips Entertainment.

Certifications

References

Rod Stewart albums
1995 albums
Albums produced by Trevor Horn
Albums produced by Lenny Waronker
Albums produced by Bernard Edwards
Warner Records albums
Albums recorded at A&M Studios